This partial list of provincial and territorial nicknames in Canada compiles the nicknames, sobriquets, and slogans that the provinces and territories are known by (or have been known by historically), officially and unofficially, to provincial and territorial governments, local people, outsiders, tourism boards, or chambers of commerce.

Provincial and territorial nicknames can help in establishing a provincial or territorial identity, helping outsiders recognize a community or attracting people to a community because of its nickname; promote provincial or territorial pride; and build community unity. They are also believed to have economic value, but their economic value is difficult to measure.

Some unofficial nicknames are positive, while others are derisive. The unofficial nicknames listed here have been in use for a long time or have gained wide use.

Provinces

Alberta 
 "The Energy Province" — Alberta produces most of Canada's crude oil and natural gas, as well as a large share of its coal.
 "The Sunshine Province"
 "Berta"
 "Texas of the North" — referring to Alberta's significance as an oil producer in Canada, similar to that of Texas to the US. The name is also used in reference to the province notably leaning to the political right, comparable to Texas.
 "Wild Rose Country" — currently used on its license plates.

British Columbia 
 "B.C."
 "Beautiful British Columbia" — currently used on its license plates.
 "The Left Coast" — a name shared with the U.S. West Coast, referring to the region notably leaning politically left.
 "The Pacific Province"
 "Super, Natural, British Columbia" — dated, official provincial slogan, formerly seen on license plates.

Manitoba 
 "The 204" — referring to the province's original area code.
 "Canada's Heart Beats" — Travel Manitoba's current slogan since 2014.
 "Friendly Manitoba" — currently used on its license plates.
 "Manisnowba" — a blend between Manitoba and snow because of how snowy the province can get.
 "The Keystone Province" — due to its position in the center of Canada.
 "The Postage Stamp Province" — in its original form upon joining Confederation, Manitoba's size and shape resembled a postage stamp when viewed a map of Canada. The name faded after the province's boundaries were extended in 1881 and 1912.
 "Sunny Manitoba" — formerly used on its license plates from 1971–1975.
 "Toba" — unofficial name used by several organizations.

Ontario 
 "The Heartland Province"
 "Land O'Lakes"
 "The Loyalist Province" — referring to Upper Canada (what is now Ontario) being one of the main destinations for Loyalists fleeing the United States during the American Revolution.
 "The Province of Opportunity" — dated, official provincial slogan, formerly seen on provincial highway construction project signs.
 "A Place to Grow" (and ) — briefly used on license plates in 2020, originally from the unofficial provincial anthem.
 "A Place to Stand" — after the eponymous 1967 film made for the provincial pavilion at Expo 67, later used for the unofficial provincial anthem.
 "Yours to Discover" (and ) — used on license plates issued since 1982.
 “The Great Lake Province”

New Brunswick 
 "The Picture Province" — formerly used on its license plates.
 "Petit Québec"
 “The Drive Through Province”

Newfoundland and Labrador 
 "Canada's Happy Province" — used on its license plates in 1968.
 "The Big Land" (Labrador)
 "The Rock"

Nova Scotia 
 "Canada's Ocean Playground" — currently used on its license plates
 "Land of the Mi'kmaq" (Miꞌkmaꞌki region) — referring to current-day Nova Scotia belonging to the Miꞌkmaꞌki region, the traditional land of the Miꞌkmaq; currently used on specialty license plates.
 "Bluenose Province”
 "The Sea Bound Coast"

Prince Edward Island 
 "Birthplace of Confederation" (and ) — currently used on its license plates since 2013 (and formerly 1997–2007).
 "The Cradle of Confederation"
 "The First Province"
 "Garden of the Gulf" — formerly used on its license plates from 1929–1930 and 1962–1965,
 "The Garden Province" or "Canada's Green Province" (and ) — the former was used on its license plates from 1966–1972; the latter was used from 2007–2012.
 "Home of Anne of Green Gables" — formerly used on its license plates from 1993–1997; refers to the titular character of the famous Anne of Green Gables novel coming from the fictional town of Avonlea in rural PEI.
 "P.E.I."

Quebec 
 "" — formerly used on license plates from 1963–1977. 
 "The Festival Province"
 "" (French for 'I Remember') — official motto of Quebec, currently used on its license plates.
 "" (French for 'I'm here') — formerly used on license plates

Saskatchewan 
 "Canada’s Bread and Butter"
 "The Drive-Through Province" — used sarcastically by Canadians, describing it as a boring province.
 "The Land of the Living Skies" — currently used on its license plates.
 "Wheat Province" — formerly used on its license plates from 1951–1959.

Territories/Northern Canada
Names used for Northern Canada more broadly or shared between the three Canadian territories:

 "Canada's Arctic" or "The Canadian Arctic"
 "Canada's Last Frontier"
 "The Land of the Midnight Sun"

Northwest Territories 
 "Canada's Northland" — formerly used on its license plates from 1954–1969.
 "Land of the Polar Bear"
 "North of Sixty" — referring to the territory's position above the 60th parallel.
 "Spectacular Northwest Territories" — currently used on its license plates.

Nunavut 
 "Our Land" — a simple translation of the Inuktitut word Nunavut.

Yukon 
 "The Klondike" — currently used on its license plates.
 "Home of the Klondike" — used on its license plates from 1971–1977.
 "Land of the Midnight Sun" — used on its license plates from 1952–1970.
 "Larger Than Life"

See also

 List of city nicknames and slogans in Canada
 List of U.S. state nicknames
 Lists of nicknames – nickname list articles on Wikipedia

References

External links
 https://web.archive.org/web/20090902031837/http://canadaproject.ecsd.net/provincial_and_territorial_trivi.htm
 http://www.johncletheroe.org/usa_can/states/index.htm

Canada, provincial and territorial
Lists of nicknames
Nicknames